Ygl, YGL or ygl may refer to:

 La Grande Rivière Airport, Quebec, Canada
 Yangum language, spoken in Papua New Guinea
 Young Global Leaders, World Economic Forum community